Calicium glaucellum is a crustose lichen that is found growing on trees throughout much of the world.

The species is commonly found in northern boreal to temperate zones in North, Central and South America and the South West region of Western Australia.

References

glaucellum
Lichen species
Lichens described in 1803
Lichens of Australia
Taxa named by Erik Acharius